The Hand is a 1965 Czechoslovak stop motion puppet animation film directed by Jiří Trnka. It was to be Trnka's final film. Critics and viewers praised The Hand as one of the best animated shorts of all time.

The film was first released in 1965. When Trnka died in 1969, the film was banned due to its story that reflects a restrictive environment in which many artists had to work.

Plot
The film features a conflict between a powerless Harlequin and a powerful Hand. Harlequin is an artist who makes Sculptures. He is commanded by The Hand to make only sculptures of Hand making a symbolic gesture, 
but Harlequin decides to resist the Hand as he wishes to make ceramic pots for his flowers. The Hand tries to change his mind by threatening him, manipulating him or by causing trouble for him.

The Hand eventually catches Harlequin with a trick and locks him in a cage where he makes the ordered Statue. The Hand rewards him with medals and laurels, but he becomes sad and decides to escape. He brings down the statue and makes a hole in the cage. He jumps out of the cage and runs away while being chased by the Hand. As he runs, he throws away all of his medals and laurels. He gets home in the end and barricades himself there. As he barricades himself in a closet, a pot with a flower falls on him. Harlequin falls to the floor and sees his beloved flowers as he dies. When the Hand gets into the House, Harlequin is already dead. The Hand, now wearing a different glove, uses the closet as a coffin for Harlequin and makes a pompous funeral for him, before expressing a new gesture.

Legacy
Jiří Trnka Memorial that was unveiled in Plzeň on 17 November 2015, commemorates The Hand.

Time Out listed The Hand in its list of top 30 animated shorts of all time.

In a Reddit AMA, Rebecca Sugar, creator of the Cartoon Network show Steven Universe named The Hand as having a major influence on her work.

Awards
List of awards received by The Hand:
Jury Special Prize, Annecy, 1965
First Prize in Category of Cartoons, Bergamo, 1965
Silver Prize, Melbourne, 1966
Best Film of All Festival Years (Award from Critics), Annecy, 1990

References

External links
The Hand on IMDb
The Hand on MUBI
The Hand on AllMovie

1965 animated films
Films directed by Jiří Trnka
Czechoslovak animated short films
Marionette films
1965 films
1965 short films
1960s animated short films
Czech animated short films
Czech horror films
Animated films without speech
1960s Czech-language films